Ozubulu is a larger town  in Anambra State, Nigeria. It is the headquarters of the Ekwusigo Local Government Area.

The town has an official Post Office. Its neighbouring towns are Nnewi, Ukpor, Ihembosi, Okija and Oraifite. Native religion is Omenana. After colonialsm, many converted to Christianity, but many respect Omenana. The town has four major Communities: Amakwa, Egbema, Eziora, and Nza.

Ozubulu became very well known after the unfortunate ozubulu massacre took place in the year 2017, this massacre happened in St. Philips Catholic Church Ozubulu Anambra State on Sunday morning during church service.

The Ozubulu massacre news went viral across Nigeria getting the attention of notable people, and those that never knew the existence of Ozubulu town instantly became aware of its existence.

Climate 
In Ozubulu, the wet season is warm, oppressive, and overcast and the dry season is hot, muggy, and partly cloudy. Over the course of the year, the temperature typically varies from 67 °F to 88 °F and is rarely below 59 °F or above 91 °F.

Notable people from Ozubulu
Chief Jerome Udoji (Igwe Ozuluohaonu of Igbo land [Eastern Nigeria]) CFR, KSJ, Papal Medalist, Lawyer, Economist, Philanthropist, Author and Technocrat.
Zubby Michael Nigerian actor, movie producer

References

Populated places in Anambra State